Eddy Soeparno is an Indonesian politician and businessman. He's currently the secretary general of the National Mandate Party. Soeparno was formerly the director of finance at the Bakrie Group subsidiary Bakrie & Brothers.

References

Indonesian Muslims
Living people
National Mandate Party politicians
Year of birth missing (living people)